Archeological Site No. 142-13 is a prehistoric camp that is part of the Penobscot Headwater Lakes Prehistoric Sites. It is located near Ripogenus, Maine and was added to the National Register on October 31, 1995.

References

		
National Register of Historic Places in Piscataquis County, Maine